North Waigaoqiao Free Trade Zone is a station on Line 6 of the Shanghai Metro. It began operation on December 29, 2007.

The station is located along North Yanggao Road within the Waigaoqiao Free Trade Zone, Pudong.

Around the station
 Waigaoqiao Power Station

References 

Railway stations in Shanghai
Shanghai Metro stations in Pudong
Line 6, Shanghai Metro
Railway stations in China opened in 2007